The 2021 Georgia's Rome Tennis Open was a professional women's tennis tournament played on outdoor hard courts. It was the first edition of the tournament which was part of the 2021 ITF Women's World Tennis Tour. It took place in Rome, Georgia, United States between 25 and 31 January 2021.

Singles main-draw entrants

Seeds

 1 Rankings are as of 18 January 2021.

Other entrants
The following players received wildcards into the singles main draw:
  Hanna Chang
  Ashlyn Krueger
  Alycia Parks
  Katrina Scott

The following player received entry using a protected ranking:
  Katie Swan

The following players received entry from the qualifying draw:
  Emina Bektas
  Irene Burillo Escorihuela
  Sarah Hamner
  Kimmi Hance
  Robin Montgomery
  Tara Moore
  Ana Sofía Sánchez
  Panna Udvardy

The following player received entry as a lucky loser:
  Maria Sanchez

Champions

Singles

 Irene Burillo Escorihuela def.  Grace Min, 1–6, 7–6(7–4), 6–1

Doubles

 Emina Bektas /  Tara Moore def.  Olga Govortsova /  Jovana Jović, 5–7, 6–2, [10–8]

References

External links
 2021 Georgia's Rome Tennis Open at ITFtennis.com

2021 ITF Women's World Tennis Tour
2021 in American tennis
January 2021 sports events in the United States
2021 in sports in Georgia (U.S. state)